Wayne Schwass (born 27 November 1968) is a former professional Australian rules footballer in the Australian Football League. He is notable as being the first New Zealand–born AFL player known to be of Māori heritage. He holds the record for VFL/AFL matches played by a New Zealand–born player, with 282.

Schwass has long been a great supporter and ambassador for Australian rules football in New Zealand, and he realised his dream of representing his country in 2012 as part of the New Zealand national team, becoming the first home-grown AFL player to play, captain and coach a country other than Australia in the sport.

Early life
Schwass was born in Christchurch, New Zealand, to mother Rae and Māori father Colin. They moved to the Warrnambool area in Victoria, Australia, when Wayne was three years old. He began playing Australian Rules at the South Warrnambool Football Club at the age of 10.

An outstanding talent, Schwass was recruited by Kangaroos as a junior and captained the North Melbourne under-19s to the premiership in 1987 and took out the Morrish Medal as the best and fairest in the under-19s.

AFL career
Following his senior debut in 1988, Schwass became a champion wingman, known for his blistering pace, courage, and accuracy on his left foot. Schwass won the club champion award, the Syd Barker Medal, twice at North Melbourne, in 1994 and 1995. He was one of the best in the Kangaroos' 1996 premiership side against Sydney and was named vice-captain to Wayne Carey. 

In 1998 in the twilight of his career, North Melbourne traded Schwass to Sydney in exchange for a young Shannon Grant.

At the Sydney Swans the following year, Schwass was an instant leader, taking out the club's best-and-fairest award and earning All-Australian selection. He would retire a few seasons later, playing just short of 100 games with the Swans, ending his serviceable AFL career.

Post-AFL career
In 2012, Schwass was a player-coach for the New Zealand representative AFL side, the New Zealand Hawks, against the Australian AIS-AFL Academy team. He has long been a great supporter and ambassador for Australian rules football in New Zealand.

Personal life
Schwass is now founder and CEO of PukaUp, a social enterprise who states their vision is "to create the environments for every person to have authentic and genuine conversations about mental health and emotional wellbeing." A regular on the public-speaking circuit, Schwass also hosts the PukaUp Podcast with PodcastONE. Schwass is still involved with AFL as a commentator for Triple M on Saturday nights and Sunday afternoons.

Statistics

|-
|- style="background-color: #EAEAEA"
! scope="row" style="text-align:center" | 1988
|style="text-align:center;"|
| 46 || 7 || 3 || 4 || 95 || 34 || 129 || 21 || 20 || 0.4 || 0.6 || 13.6 || 4.9 || 18.4 || 3.0 || 2.9 || 0
|-
! scope="row" style="text-align:center" | 1989
|style="text-align:center;"|
| 2 || 22 || 14 || 10 || 265 || 177 || 442 || 40 || 51 || 0.6 || 0.5 || 12.0 || 8.0 || 20.1 || 1.8 || 2.3 || 10
|- style="background-color: #EAEAEA"
! scope="row" style="text-align:center" | 1990
|style="text-align:center;"|
| 2 || 15 || 7 || 6 || 173 || 121 || 294 || 27 || 27 || 0.5 || 0.4 || 11.5 || 8.1 || 19.6 || 1.8 || 1.8 || 3
|-
! scope="row" style="text-align:center" | 1991
|style="text-align:center;"|
| 2 || 21 || 8 || 10 || 306 || 147 || 453 || 75 || 46 || 0.4 || 0.5 || 14.6 || 7.0 || 21.6 || 3.6 || 2.2 || 13
|- style="background-color: #EAEAEA"
! scope="row" style="text-align:center" | 1992
|style="text-align:center;"|
| 2 || 14 || 7 || 5 || 209 || 91 || 300 || 41 || 37 || 0.5 || 0.4 || 14.9 || 6.5 || 21.4 || 2.9 || 2.6 || 2
|-
! scope="row" style="text-align:center" | 1993
|style="text-align:center;"|
| 2 || 19 || 14 || 5 || 313 || 124 || 437 || 32 || 49 || 0.7 || 0.3 || 16.5 || 6.5 || 23.0 || 1.7 || 2.6 || 14
|- style="background-color: #EAEAEA"
! scope="row" style="text-align:center" | 1994
|style="text-align:center;"|
| 2 || 24 || 15 || 13 || 353 || 177 || 530 || 54 || 61 || 0.6 || 0.5 || 14.7 || 7.4 || 22.1 || 2.3 || 2.5 || 19
|-
! scope="row" style="text-align:center" | 1995
|style="text-align:center;"|
| 2 || 25 || 19 || 14 || 381 || 171 || 552 || 77 || 50 || 0.8 || 0.6 || 15.2 || 6.8 || 22.1 || 3.1 || 2.0 || 13
|- style="background-color: #EAEAEA"
|style="text-align:center;background:#afe6ba;"|1996†
|style="text-align:center;"|
| 2 || 17 || 3 || 5 || 214 || 89 || 303 || 46 || 33 || 0.2 || 0.3 || 12.6 || 5.2 || 17.8 || 2.7 || 1.9 || 6
|-
! scope="row" style="text-align:center" | 1997
|style="text-align:center;"|
| 2 || 20 || 7 || 5 || 264 || 89 || 353 || 53 || 46 || 0.4 || 0.3 || 13.2 || 4.5 || 17.7 || 2.7 || 2.3 || 8
|- style="background-color: #EAEAEA"
! scope="row" style="text-align:center" | 1998
|style="text-align:center;"|
| 2 || 22 || 23 || 6 || 380 || 127 || 507 || 61 || 38 || 1.0 || 0.3 || 17.3 || 5.8 || 23.0 || 2.8 || 1.7 || 15
|-
! scope="row" style="text-align:center" | 1999
|style="text-align:center;"|
| 2 || 23 || 9 || 9 || 429 || 184 || 613 || 98 || 49 || 0.4 || 0.4 || 18.7 || 8.0 || 26.7 || 4.3 || 2.1 || 19
|- style="background-color: #EAEAEA"
! scope="row" style="text-align:center" | 2000
|style="text-align:center;"|
| 2 || 22 || 12 || 14 || 347 || 195 || 542 || 102 || 65 || 0.5 || 0.6 || 15.8 || 8.9 || 24.6 || 4.6 || 3.0 || 8
|-
! scope="row" style="text-align:center" | 2001
|style="text-align:center;"|
| 2 || 22 || 12 || 8 || 295 || 152 || 447 || 79 || 54 || 0.5 || 0.4 || 13.4 || 6.9 || 20.3 || 3.6 || 2.5 || 7
|- style="background-color: #EAEAEA"
! scope="row" style="text-align:center" | 2002
|style="text-align:center;"|
| 2 || 9 || 1 || 1 || 75 || 55 || 130 || 14 || 15 || 0.1 || 0.1 || 8.3 || 6.1 || 14.4 || 1.6 || 1.7 || 0
|- class="sortbottom"
! colspan=3| Career
! 282
! 154
! 115
! 4099
! 1933
! 6032
! 820
! 641
! 0.5
! 0.4
! 14.5
! 6.9
! 21.4
! 2.9
! 2.3
! 137
|}

References

External links 

 500 'Puka Up' and bring issue of suicide out into the light in Wangaratta community walk

1968 births
VFL/AFL players born outside Australia
Sydney Swans players
North Melbourne Football Club players
North Melbourne Football Club Premiership players
Victorian State of Origin players
South Warrnambool Football Club players
Bob Skilton Medal winners
Syd Barker Medal winners
All-Australians (AFL)
Australian people of German descent
Australian rules football commentators
Living people
New Zealand emigrants to Australia
New Zealand players of Australian rules football
Australian rules footballers from Victoria (Australia)
Australian people of Māori descent
New Zealand Māori sportspeople
One-time VFL/AFL Premiership players